was a Japanese domain of the Edo period, located in Tōtōmi Province. It was centered on what is now Hamamatsu Castle in what is now the city of Hamamatsu in Shizuoka Prefecture.

Hamamatsu was the residence of Tokugawa Ieyasu for much of his early career, and Hamamatsu Castle was nicknamed  due to Ieyasu's promotion to shōgun. The domain was thus considered a prestigious posting, and was seen as a stepping stone in a daimyōs rise to higher levels with the administration of the Tokugawa shogunate, such rōjū or wakadoshiyori.

The domain had a population of 3324 samurai in 776 households at the start of the Meiji period. The domain maintained its primary residence (kamiyashiki) in Edo at Toranomon until the An'ei (1772–1781) period, and at Nihonbashi-Hamacho until the Meiji period

Holdings at the end of the Edo period
As with most domains in the han system, Hamamatsu Domain consisted of several discontinuous territories calculated to provide the assigned kokudaka, based on periodic cadastral surveys and projected agricultural yields.

 Tōtōmi Province
 94 villages in Fuchi District
 87 villages in Nagakami District
 28 villages in Toyoda District
 3 villages in Saya District
 2 villages in Kitō District
 Shimōsa Province
 38 villages in Inba District
 Harima Province
 7 villages in Minō District
 19 villages in Katō District

List of daimyōs

See also 
 List of Han

References
Footnotes

Sources

External links
  Hamamatsu on "Edo 300 HTML" (9 Oct. 2007)
  family crest

Domains of Japan
1601 establishments in Japan
States and territories established in 1601
1868 disestablishments in Japan
States and territories disestablished in 1868
Tōtōmi Province
History of Shizuoka Prefecture
Matsudaira clan
Mizuno clan
Ogyū-Matsudaira clan
Ōkōchi-Matsudaira clan
Ōta clan